Ashley Brzozowicz (born December 17, 1982) is a Canadian rower. She was raised in London, Ontario. Her rowing career began as a sophomore at St. Ignatius College Prep in Chicago. She graduated from Yale University with a Bachelor of Arts degree in History of Art.

Brzozowicz finished second at the NCAA championships in 2004.

Brzozowicz finished in fourth place at the 2008 Summer Olympics in Beijing, China in the women's eights with Jane Thornton, Darcy Marquardt, Buffy-Lynne Williams, Sarah Bonikowsky, Romina Stefancic, Andréanne Morin, Heather Mandoli and cox Lesley Thompson-Willie.

At the 2012 Summer Olympics in London, Brzozowicz won a silver medal in the Women's eights.

References

External links
Profile at Rowing Canada

1982 births
Living people
Canadian expatriates in the United States
Canadian female rowers
Medalists at the 2012 Summer Olympics
Olympic medalists in rowing
Olympic rowers of Canada
Olympic silver medalists for Canada
Rowers at the 2008 Summer Olympics
Rowers at the 2012 Summer Olympics
Rowers from London, Ontario
Rowers from Toronto
World Rowing Championships medalists for Canada
Yale College alumni